Theatre New Brunswick is the only English language professional theatre company in New Brunswick, Canada. It began operation in 1968, and has been successfully operating since that time.

Artistic directors
Walter Learning (1968-1978)
Malcolm Black (1978-1984)
Janet Amos (1984-1988)
Sharon Pollock (1988-1990)
Michael Shamata (1990-1995)
Walter Learning (1995-1999)
David Sherrin (1999-2003)
Scott Burke (2003-2005)
Claude Giroux (2005-2006)
Leigh Rivenbark (2006-2009)
Caleb Marshall (2009–2014)
Thomas Morgan Jones (2015-2018)
Natasha MacLellan (2018–present)

2018-2019 Repertoire

Mainstage
Any Given Moment by Kim Parkhill
Come Down From Up River by Norm Foster 
The Lion, The Witch and The Wardrobe by C.S. Lewis | Dramatized by Joseph Robinette
A Brief History of the Maritimes and Everywhere Else by Ryan Griffith

TNB Young Company
Gretel & Hansel by the Brothers Grimm | Adapted by Thomas Morgan Jones
Sania the Destroyer by Mona'a Malik

TNB Theatre School's Senior Musical Theatre program
The Wizard of Oz based upon the book by L. Frank Baum | Music and lyrics by Harold Arlen and  E. Y. Harburg:

References

External links

Theatre companies in New Brunswick
Theatre festivals in Canada
1968 establishments in New Brunswick